Illicium kinabaluensis is a species of tree in the family Schisandraceae, or alternately, the Illiciaceae. It is endemic to Mount Kinabalu, the tallest mountain on Borneo. It grows in forests at an elevation of 1200 to 2000 meters.

References

kinabaluensis
Endemic flora of Borneo
Trees of Borneo
Flora of Sabah
Vulnerable plants
Taxonomy articles created by Polbot
Flora of Mount Kinabalu
Flora of the Borneo montane rain forests